Graham Christopher Spencer Mather CBE (born 23 October 1954, Preston) is a British former Member of the European Parliament (MEP).

Mather was educated at Hutton Grammar School and New College, Oxford.  While there, he became an officer in the Oxford University Conservative Association.  He became a lawyer, and was also a visiting fellow at Nuffield College, and spent time as the head of the policy unit at the Institute of Directors.  At the 1983 general election, he unsuccessfully stood in Blackburn.

He was a Conservative Party Member of the European Parliament (MEP) from 1994 to 1999 for the Hampshire North and Oxford constituency, and had been a member of the Westminster City Council 1982–86. He has been a non executive director of Ofcom since 2014  and of ORR since 2016. He is also president of the European Policy Forum.

Mather was appointed Commander of the Order of the British Empire (CBE) in the 2017 Birthday Honours for services to economic regulation, competition, and infrastructure development.

References

1954 births
Living people
Conservative Party (UK) councillors
Conservative Party (UK) MEPs
Conservative Party (UK) parliamentary candidates
Councillors in the City of Westminster
MEPs for England 1994–1999
People educated at Hutton Grammar School
Alumni of Nuffield College, Oxford
Commanders of the Order of the British Empire